Luzula wahlenbergii, commonly known as Wahlenberg's woodrush or reindeer wood-rush, is a perennial species of plant in the genus Luzula of the (rush) family Juncaceae.

Taxonomy and naming 
Luzula wahlenbergii is in the section Diprophyllatae of the genus Luzula of the (rush) family Juncaceae. L. wahlenbergii was first formally described by the Austro-Russian botanist Franz Josef Ruprecht in 1845.

With regards to the etymology of the binomial: the generic name Luzula could  come from the Italian lucciola ("to shine, sparkle") or the Latin luzulae or luxulae, from lux ("light"), inspired by the way the plant's hairs sparkle when wet with dew. Another etymology sometimes given is that it does derive from lucciola but that this meant a midsummerfield, or from the Latin luculus, meaning a small place; the same source also states that this name was applied by Luigi Anguillara (an Italian botanist) in 1561. The second part of the binomial, wahlenbergii  is in tribute to the Swedish botanist Göran Wahlenberg, who studied the flora of the northernmost areas of Sweden.

Description 
It is almost hairless. Its leaves have very small serrations at the edges and taper to a point.

The plant's inflorescence has been described by eMonocot as a "lax nodding panicle". Measuring , it bears 10–30 flowers, with between one and three to a stem. Each flower has six stamens.

Distribution and habitat 
Luzula wahlenbergii has a relatively wide distribution, growing across Arctic Eurasia, far-east Russia (including Transbaikal), Alaska, Greenland, Canada and the mountains of Scandinavia.

Luzula wahlenbergii is an arctic-alpine plant, and grows in mainly moist habitats. These include, but are not limited to, wet grasslands, mossy tundra, the shores of lakes, alluvial rivers, gneissic seashore and alpine creeks.

References

Plants described in 1845
wahlenbergii
Flora of the Arctic
Flora of Europe
Flora of North America
Flora of temperate Asia